Foreign Student is a 1994 American drama film directed by Eva Sereny and written by Menno Meyjes. The film stars Robin Givens, Marco Hofschneider, Rick Johnson, Charlotte Ross, Edward Herrmann and Jack Coleman. The film was released on July 29, 1994, by Gramercy Pictures.

When young French student Philippe Leclerc (Marco Hofschneider) gets awarded a fellowship to study abroad in the United States, he is thrilled to experience American culture firsthand. Enrolling at a well-regarded university in Virginia, Philippe initially has a difficult time adjusting to his foreign environment. While Philippe gains the attention of an attractive classmate, Sue Ann (Charlotte Ross), he is more intrigued by a beautiful young black woman, April (Robin Givens).

Cast 
Robin Givens as April
Marco Hofschneider as Philippe Leclerc
Rick Johnson as Cal Cate
Charlotte Ross as Elizabeth 'Sue Ann' Baldridge
Edward Herrmann as Zachary 'Zach' Gilmore
Jack Coleman as Rex Jennings
Charles S. Dutton as Howlin' Wolf 
Hinton Battle as Sonny Boy Williamson
Anthony Herrera as Coach Mallard
Bob Child as Counselor
David Long as Mr. Baldridge
Ruth Williamson as Mrs. Baldridge
Michael Reilly Burke as Harrison
Michael Goodwin as Assistant Coach
Jon Hendricks as April's Father
Andy Park as Sheriff McLain
Brendan Medlin as Hans 
Kevin A. Parrott as Buster Dubonnet
Cliff McMullen as Preacher
Jane Beard as Doris Jennings
Sutton Knight as Editor
John Habberton as William Faulkner
Jonathan Sale as Herbie Clemson

References

External links 
 
 

1994 films
1990s English-language films
Gramercy Pictures films
1994 drama films
International education industry
African-American drama films
Films about interracial romance
1990s American films